is a one-shot manga created by Monkey Punch. It was originally published in the Kobunsha magazine Popcorn in 1980. An alternate version was published in Anime DO in 1982. The plot follows the adventures of impoverished private detective Ranma Hinamatsuri and his thrill-seeking rich girl partner Rella "Cindy" Shirayuki in a futuristic city named "Kirin Town".  Kirin Town is a lawless European city-state with its own currency with the name of the city being a pun on the English word for "killing".  The two are badly injured when they stumble across an organised crime operation and are put back together into the same body by a mysterious doctor. Every night the stroke of midnight, their shared body changes both form and identity.  Ranma becomes Rella, or vice versa. Neither is aware of any actions or situations their partner is involved in, completely losing consciousness until twenty-four hours later, when the change comes around to them again.

The names of the story's protagonists both reflect the nature of their change.  
Ranma shares a name with Ranma Saotome, the title character of Ranma ½, who also changes into a girl under certain conditions. However, the original Cinderella Boy manga predates Ranma ½ by several years.
Rella is named after Cinderella, who is known for undergoing a major change at the stroke of midnight.  Her last name "Shirayuki" translates into "Snow White" and the episode titles also evoke fairytales.

Discotek Media have licensed the anime for a North American release.

Characters
  The acrophobic and technologically illiterate hero, he's constantly struggling to keep his agency self-supporting, partly because he regularly takes poorly paying cases out of a sense of chivalry.  He also has no head for alcohol and collected model cars.  Before becoming a detective, he was a local gangster who developed scruples.

  A wealthy and adventurous woman who joined with Ranma to create the R&R Agency.  She has an enormous capacity for alcohol and loves gadgets and computers.  She also has an eye for jewellery and can expertly distinguish real from fake at a glance.  Her father is a major organised crime figure in Japan, and she is estranged from him.

  Top mobster in the city, whenever he sees Ranma he orders his men to kill him.  However, he has a good reputation as a pillar of the community with the public at large.

  Mysterious woman who spies on Ranma and alternately saves him and sets him up to see what will happen.

  Wealthy buffoon who appears on every one of Rella's days to try to woo her.  He is the son of a wealthy pharmaceutical manufacturer who Rella suspects of having poisoned her in Episode 5.

  Rella's elderly and maternal maid who dislikes Ranma for his lack of class and leading her mistress into danger.  She makes gadgets for her mistress.

  The scientist who fused Ranma and Rella's bodies into one using his Personality Fusion theory.

  All-knowing underworld informant who enjoys making Ranma meet him on a window-washer's platform to do business.

 A net informant whose identity is unknown, Rella relies on her to gather information, it searches any information on the net.

  Bar owner who is enthusiastically attracted to Ranma but is also one of Son Tai Jin's many girlfriends.

Episodes

References

External links

1980 manga
2003 anime television series debuts
AT-X (TV network) original programming
Fiction about body swapping
Discotek Media
Magic Bus (studio)
One-shot manga
Seinen manga
Wowow original programming